P39 or P-39 may refer to:

 Bell P-39 Airacobra, an American fighter aircraft
 , a submarine of the Royal Navy
 P39 road (Ukraine)
 Papyrus 39, a biblical manuscript
 Phosphorus-39, an isotope of phosphorus
 Pier 39
 Transcription factor Jun, the Fos-binding protein p39
 P39, a Latvian state regional road